The R558 road is a regional road in Ireland, linking Tralee and Fenit in County Kerry.

Route
It starts in Tralee at its junction with the R551 at Mounthawk Cross at the boundary between County Kerry and Tralee town and continues via Clogherbrien, Spa, Kilfernora and Fenit to Fenit Pier.

See also
Roads in Ireland
National primary road
National secondary road

References
Roads Act 1993 (Classification of Regional Roads) Order 2006 – Department of Transport

Regional roads in the Republic of Ireland
Roads in County Kerry